The Berlin-Boylston Regional School District consists of one school serving grades 6-12: Tahanto Regional Middle/High School. The school is physically situated in Boylston, Massachusetts, adjacent to the Wachusett Reservoir. The towns of Berlin and Boylston, both located in Worcester County, are the member communities of the district.

Both towns maintain their own K-5 school districts, separate from the regional district. This means there are three legal districts serving the two towns. The towns have a superintendency union agreement by which the three districts share one school superintendent and district-level administration (such as Financial Director and Director of Pupil Personnel Services).

Administration 
Superintendent of Schools: Jeffrey T. Zanghi
Tahanto Regional Middle/High School
 Principal: Diane Tucceri

External links 
2011 Newsweek Ranking of Best American High Schools
Berlin-Boylston Regional School District
Massachusetts DOE Profile - Tahanto Regional Middle/High School
Boston Globe Annual MCAS Rankings for Berlin-Boylston Regional Schools (Tahanto) 2009

School districts in Massachusetts
Education in Worcester County, Massachusetts